Emanuel Mariano Insúa Zapata (born 10 April 1991) is an Argentine professional footballer who plays as a left back for Vélez Sarsfield.

Career
Born in Buenos Aires, Insúa was a Boca Juniors youth graduate. He made his professional debut on 25 April 2012, coming on as a late substitute in a 1–1 away draw against Olimpo, for the season's Copa Argentina.

Insúa made his league debut on 20 May, starting in a 2–0 away win against Racing Club. In July 2012 he was loaned to fellow league team Godoy Cruz, appearing in 33 matches; he also scored his first professional goal for the club, netting the last in a 2–0 home win against Atlético Rafaela on 19 August.

Insúa returned to Boca in June 2013, and was assigned to the main squad. He appeared more regularly with the club in the following campaigns. He scored his first goal for the Azul y Oro on 18 August, against the same opponent.

On 20 January 2015, Insúa signed a four-and-a-half year contract with La Liga side Granada CF, for a transfer fee estimated in the region of €2.5 million. He made his debut in the competition five days later, starting and playing the full 90 minutes in a 2–2 away draw against Deportivo de La Coruña. 
On 22 August 2015 Insúa was loaned to Genoa for one year, with a buyout clause, but eventually joined Udinese Calcio, for the kick off of the 2015-16 season. He managed to play only once with the club for Coppa Italia.

On 23 August 2017, Insúa left Udinese Calcio after one season and a half, mostly spent playing as loanee first for Newell's Old Boys, then for Racing Avellaneda, and officially signed over to Super League club Panathinaikos, on a 3-year deal for an undisclosed fee.
The Argentine left back is another who has failed to have an impact in the club. He has struggled to dislodge Niklas Hult from the starting side. He has found playing minutes hard to come by and his red card at PAOK will not win over any fans. If, as rumoured, Hult departs, the club will find itself in a sticky situation at left back.
On 24 February 2018, Insúa changed direction skillfully with a cheeky backheel before sending a superb curling shot with the outside of his left foot past a hopeless Nikos Melissas, sealing the score in a 2–0 home win game. It was his first goal with the club.
On 24 November 2018, Insúa scored after playing a neat one-two with Federico Macheda, in a hammering 5–1 home win game against struggling Apollon Smyrnis. On 6 April 2019, Insúa produced a magical goal as Panathinaikos moved to within five points of fifth-placed Aris after claiming a solid 2–0 home win over the Thessaloniki club at the Olympic Stadium. The Argentine met Omri Altman’s low cross perfectly and lofted the ball up and over Aris goalkeeper Julián Cuesta and into the net in stylish fashion.

On 13 August 2020, Insúa signed a three-year contract with AEK Athens. Overall, Insúa made 60 appearances in the Super League for Panathinaikos, contributing with four goals and three assists while impressing with his energetic, passionate approach on the left flank. Insúa has been signed as a direct replacement for fellow attacking full-back Niklas Hult. On 16 February 2021, he returned to Argentina and joined Primera División side Aldosivi on loan until June, where his brother Emiliano had also recently moved to. On 25 January 2022, after he solved his contract with AEK Athens, he signed a year contract with Argentine Primera División club Vélez Sarsfield for an undisclosed fee.

Personal life
Insúa is the younger brother of fellow professional footballer Emiliano Insúa.

References

External links
 
 
 

1991 births
Living people
Footballers from Buenos Aires
Argentine footballers
Association football defenders
Argentine Primera División players
Super League Greece players
Granada CF footballers
Boca Juniors footballers
Godoy Cruz Antonio Tomba footballers
La Liga players
Racing Club de Avellaneda footballers
Newell's Old Boys footballers
Panathinaikos F.C. players
AEK Athens F.C. players
Aldosivi footballers
Club Atlético Vélez Sarsfield footballers
Argentine expatriate footballers
Argentine expatriate sportspeople in Spain
Expatriate footballers in Spain
Argentine expatriate sportspeople in Italy
Expatriate footballers in Italy
Argentine expatriate sportspeople in Greece
Expatriate footballers in Greece